The Mammoth Lakes Film Festival is a five-day film festival that screens independent features and shorts in Mammoth Lakes, California, a mountain resort town in the Eastern Sierra. The festival, founded by Shira Dubrovner in 2015 with Paul Sbrizzi as director of programming, takes place over Memorial Day weekend each year, and was named as one of the Top 50 Festivals Worth The Entry Fee by Moviemaker Magazine in 2016 and 2017.

Festivals

2015
The 2015 Mammoth Lakes Film Festival was held May 27–30, 2015. The event opened with the film Steve Jobs: The Man in the Machine, and closed with Cartel Land. The Jury Judges were Andrew Lazar, Kristanna Loken, Larry Meistrich, Allison Amon, Yana Gorskaya, Kathleen Kinmont, Kimberley Browning, and Breven Angaelica Warren.

2016
The 2nd Annual Mammoth Lakes Film Festival was held May 25–29, 2016. The festival opened with the film Operation Avalanche (film). Joe Dante was presented with the Sierra Spirit Award. The festival Jury Judges were John Fiedler, Kelly Leow, John Wirth (television producer), Allison Amon, John Scheinfeld, Katherine Tulich, Bojana Sandic, and Amanda Salazar.

2017
The 3rd Annual Mammoth Lakes Film Festival was held May 24–28, 2017. The event opened with the film Up In Smoke, with actor Tommy Chong in-person for a question-and-answer panel following the screening. The Sierra Spirit Award was presented to John Sayles by Vincent Spano, following a screening of Baby It's You (film). The festival Jury Judges were Allison Amon, Judy Coppage, Devin Digonno, Zackary Gilyani, Jacques Thelemaque, Kelly Leow, Sandra Seeling Lipski, and Bobby Putka.

Awards

2015
Audience Award for Narrative Feature -- They Look Like People - IMDb
Audience Award for Documentary -- Omo Child: The River and the Bush - IMDb
Jury Award for Narrative Feature -- Diamond Tongues - IMDb
Jury Award for Documentary Feature -- Autism In Love - IMDb
Jury Special Mention Bravery Award -- Cartel Land - IMDB
Jury Award for Narrative Short -- Una Nit - IMDb
Jury Honorable Mention for Narrative Short -- Upon The Rock - IMDb
Jury Award for Animation or Documentary Short -- Tourist Trap - IMDb
Jury Honorable Mention for Animation or Documentary Short -- The Tide Keeper - IMDb

2016
Audience Award for Feature Narrative -- Buddymoon - IMDb
Audience Award for Feature Documentary -- Learning to See (film) - IMDb
Jury Award for Narrative Feature -- Bodkin Ras - IMDb
Jury Award for Documentary Feature -- Sonita (film) - IMDb
Jury Bravery Award Feature Documentary -- Under the Sun (2015 film) - IMDb
Jury Special Mention Feature Narrative -- Mad - IMDb
Jury Award for Narrative Short -- A Night in Tokoriki - IMDb
Jury Honorable Mention for Narrative Short -- Tisure - IMDb
Jury Award for Animation or Documentary Short -- The Second Life 
Jury Honorable Mention for Animation or Documentary Short -- The Night Stalker (2015 film) - IMDb

2017
Audience Award for Feature Narrative -- Withdrawn - 
International Narrative Feature Grand Jury Award -- Cold Breath -
IMDb
Audience Award for Feature Documentary -- Strad Style - IMDb
Jury Award for Narrative Feature -- Space Detective (film) - IMDb
Jury Award for Documentary Feature -- Strad Style - IMDb
Jury Bravery Award Feature Documentary -- Forever B (film) - IMDb
Jury Special Mention Feature Narrative -- The Great Unwashed (film) - IMDb
Jury Award for Narrative Short -- Flowereyes 
Jury Special Mention Narrative Short -- Call Your Father - IMDb
Jury Special Mention Narrative Short -- Sadhu in Bombay - IMDb
Jury Award for Documentary Short -- 52-The Trolleybus - IMDb
Jury Award for Animated Short -- Little Red Giant, The Monster That I Was - IMDB
Jury Special Mention Animated Short -- Adam (2016 film) - IMDb

Footnotes

References
Visit Mammoth
News from the Mammoth Lakes Film Festival

External links
Official site

Film festivals in California
Tourist attractions in Mono County, California